The Travesser Formation is a geologic formation in northeastern New Mexico, southeastern Colorado, westernmost Oklahoma, and northwestern Texas, particularly in the Dry Cimarron valley. It preserves fossils dating back to the late Triassic period.

Description
The formation unconformably overlies the Baldy Hill Formation and underlies the Sloan Canyon Formation or locally the Exeter Sandstone.

The formation is usually assigned to the Dockum Group. The proposal of Spencer G. Lucas and his collaborators to abandon the Dockum Group, possibly in favor of the Chinle Group, is highly controversial.

Formations
A fossil phytosaur skull and metoposaurids have been found in the formation.

History of investigation
The formation was first named by Baldwin and Muelberger in 1959. Lucas et al. rejected the assignment of the formation to the Dockum Group and adjusted the lower contact.

See also

 List of fossiliferous stratigraphic units in New Mexico
 Paleontology in New Mexico

References

Triassic formations of New Mexico